Arkady Vainshtein (born 24 February 1942) is a Russian and American Professor Emeritus of Theoretical physics who was awarded Pomeranchuk Prize (2005) and Sakurai Prize (1999) for theoretical physics.

Biography
Vainshtein was born on 24 February 1942 in Novokuznetsk, Russia. He got his Ph.D. from Budker Institute of Nuclear Physics in Novosibirsk, Russia and master's degree from Novosibirsk University where he became a Professor. He was the director of William I Fine Theoretical Physics Institute, University of Minnesota where he currently serves as the Gloria Becker Lubkin chair and also holds a position as Professor since 1990. In 1997 he became a fellow at the APS and two years later was awarded Sakurai Prize. In 2004 he started to work for Kavli Institute for Theoretical Physics in Santa Barbara, California, and a year later was awarded Pomeranchuk Prize from the Institute for Theoretical and Experimental Physics, Moscow. Professor Vainshtein was awarded the 2014 Julius Wess Award by The KIT Center Elementary Particle and Astroparticle Physics (KCETA) and the 2016 Dirac Medal and Prize.

See also
 Penguin mechanism

References

1942 births
Living people
People from Novokuznetsk
Scientists from Novosibirsk
Novosibirsk State University alumni
University of Minnesota faculty
Fellows of the American Physical Society
J. J. Sakurai Prize for Theoretical Particle Physics recipients
21st-century American physicists
Russian physicists
Academic staff of Novosibirsk State University